David Fifita may refer to:
 David Fifita (rugby league, born 1989)
 David Fifita (rugby league, born 2000)